The Luxembourg Athletics Federation, abbreviated to FLA, is the governing body for the sport of athletics in Luxembourg.  It was founded on 11 November 1928, replacing the Federation of Luxembourgian Athletic Sports Societies.

List of presidents
 Edmond Marx (1928–1940)
 Alex Servais (1945–1947)
 Jos Lucius (1947–1958)
 Pierre Wies (1958)
 Jos Lucius (1959)
 Emile Goebel (1960–1961)
 François Mersch (1961–1962)
 Josy Barthel (1962–1972)
 Norbert Haupert (1973–1979)
 Mil Jung (1980–1989)
 Jean-Marie Janssen (1991–2000)
 Alex Bodry (2001 – 2010)
 Claude Haagen (2010–2018)
 Stéphanie Empain (2018–present)

See also
List of athletics clubs in Luxembourg

Footnotes

External links
 Luxembourg Athletics Federation official website

Luxembourg
Athletics in Luxembourg
Athletics Federation
1928 establishments in Luxembourg
Strassen, Luxembourg
Sports organizations established in 1928
National governing bodies for athletics